There will be a maximum of 60 athletes competing in racquetball (33 males and 27 females). All countries must compete in the 2011 Pan American Racquetball championship to qualify athletes to the games, including Mexico the host nation. After the tournament is completed each nation will be given scores for each event, and the top countries will qualify athletes. Each nation can enter the pairs and teams competition, provided they have qualified at least two athletes.

Qualification summary

Men

Women

References 

2.  - The number of athletes each nation qualified.

Qualification for the 2011 Pan American Games
Racquetball at the 2011 Pan American Games